The Große Sandspitze in Tyrol is  and the highest mountain in the Gailtal Alps, a mountain range of the Southern Limestone Alps. It is located within the subrange of the Lienz Dolomites and is locally called the Sunnspitz.

First ascent 
The first ascent of the Große Sandspitze was made by Franz Mitterhofer, a farmer from Tristach, known as Kreitmeier, on 2 July 1886. The first recreational ascent was by August Kolp and Ignaz Linder, a little later, on 20 July 1886. The standard route, used by the first climbers, is rated as climbing grade II.

References

Literature 
Peterka, Hubert and End, Willi (1984). Alpenvereinsführer Lienzer Dolomiten, Bergverlag Rother, Munich, 

Mountains of the Alps
Mountains of Tyrol (state)
Two-thousanders of Austria
Lienz Dolomites